is a 1997 Japanese drama film directed by Masahiro Shinoda. It was entered into the 47th Berlin International Film Festival.

Cast
 Kyōzō Nagatsuka as Koichi / Elder Keita
 Hideyuki Kasahara as Onda Keita, younger
 Jun Toba as Koji
 Shima Iwashita as Fuji
 Hinano Yoshikawa as Yukiko
 Michiko Hada as Komachi
 Junji Takada as Black Marketeer
 Toshiya Nagasawa
 Sayuri Kawauchi as Onda Hideko
 Shōhei Hino
 Chōichirō Kawarazaki
 Akaji Maro
 Takashi Tsumura as Interpreter

References

External links

1997 films
1997 drama films
Japanese drama films
1990s Japanese-language films
Films directed by Masahiro Shinoda
1990s Japanese films